Tzucacab is a town and the municipal seat of the Tzucacab Municipality, Yucatán, in Mexico.

References

Populated places in Yucatán